This article includes a chart representing proven reserves, production, consumption, exports and imports of oil by country.

Methodology 
Below the chart numbers there is specified which position a country holds by the corresponding parameter. Dependent territories, not fully recognized countries and supranational entities are not ranked. By default countries are ranked by their total proven oil reserves.

Note that data related to one parameter may be more up to date than data related to some other.

See also separate lists and their source pages:

List of countries by proven oil reserves
List of countries by oil production
List of countries by oil consumption
List of countries by oil exports
List of countries by oil imports

Countries

See also
Commodity dependence

References

 
 
Energy-related lists by country
Petroleum economics
Lists of countries